Annie David (born 17 January 1963) is a French politician who served as a Senator for Isère from 2001 to 2017. A member of the French Communist Party, she was a Communist, Republican, and Citizen group during her tenure. David is a native of La Tronche, Isère and has been a municipal coucillorof Villard-Bonnot since 2001. She was elected to the Senate in 2001 and reelected in 2011.

References
Page on the Senate website

1963 births
Living people
People from La Tronche
French Senators of the Fifth Republic
Women members of the Senate (France)
21st-century French women politicians
Senators of Isère